Antoine-Bonaventure Pitrot (31 March 1727, in Marseille – after 1792), known as Pitrot aîné (Pitrot the elder), was a French dancer, choreographer and ballet master.  He was the elder brother of Jean-Baptiste Pitrot, and their father Barthélemy Pitrot was an actor who criss-crossed the French provinces in the first half of the 18th century.

Antoine Pitrot began his career at the Opéra de Paris in 1744 and then as ballet-master at the Théâtre-Italien.  He pursued a brilliant career, appearing across Europe and even in Russia, and composed several ballets.  He is considered one of the precursors of Paris's 'ballet d'action'.

References

External links
 His ballets and productions of them on CÉSAR

1727 births
1792 deaths
Entertainers from Marseille
Paris Opera Ballet dancers
French choreographers
18th-century French ballet dancers
French ballet masters
French male ballet dancers